Pallakae or pallakai (singular pallake (παλλακή)) was the general name given to a concubine in ancient Greece.

Etymology
The word pallake, "concubine" is of uncertain etymology. R. S. P. Beekes has suggested a Pre-Greek origin and a connection with Latin paelex, "mistress," which is also a loanword from a non-Indo-European Mediterranean language.

Status 
The status of these women was that of slaves, usually captured in war and brought back to Greece, either for the use of their captor, or to be sold. These women were allowed to be bought or sold just as any other slave in the Greek world.

One such account of this appears with Cassandra in Aeschylus' play, where she is brought to Agamemnon's palace as a mistress. She is later killed by Clytemnestra, alongside Agamemnon.

Social acceptability 
The pallakai were accepted as part of Greek society. In the speech "Against Neaera", it is said:We have hetairai for pleasure, pallakai for the body's daily needs, and gynaekes for the bearing of legitimate children and for the guardianship of our houses.

Literature 
There are many examples of pallakai in literature and drama.

The most lengthy is the "Against Neaera" speech, in which a woman called Neaera and her husband are prosecuted for claiming citizen rights falsely for her and the children she bore to her husband. This was considered a very serious crime, especially in Athens, where citizenship was restricted to those with a citizen mother and father. The case made against her alleges that she was a pallake in Corinth and other cities, before coming to Athens. The defense speech, however, does not survive, but one such possible defense may have been that she was a mistress rather than a prostitute, which was a normal social practice.

Another such example occurs in the text "Against the Stepmother for Poisoning", a speech by Antiphon. In this speech for the prosecution, it is alleged that a woman persuaded a pallake to poison her husband.

See also
 Women in Classical Athens

References

External links
Text of the Agamemnon
Text of the Oration Against Neaera in Greek and English Athenaze, Balme and Lawall, OUP Publishing, USA, 1995

Sexuality in ancient Greece
Concubinage